South Binyang Cave is cave number 159 at the Longmen Grottoes near Luoyang, Henan province, China.

History
Initiated by order of Emperor Xuanwu of the Northern Wei in honour of his parents Emperor Xiaowen and Empress Wenzhao, the cave was not completed until the Sui.

Features
The main image is an Amitabha which is said to represent the transition of solemn and majestic Northern Wei sculpture in to the more lifelike style of the Tang.  There are multiple inscriptions in the cave, and additional figures are also present (possibly bodhisattvas).

Nearby caves
Middle Binyang Cave and North Binyang Cave are adjacent to the north..

Images

References

Chinese sculpture
Chinese Buddhist grottoes
Caves of Henan
Tourist attractions in Henan